The 1911–12 Football League season was Birmingham Football Club's 20th in the Football League and their 12th in the Second Division. They finished in 12th position in the 20-team division. They also took part in the 1911–12 FA Cup, entering at the first round proper and losing in that round to Barnsley after a replay. Off the field, Howard Cant succeeded Walter W. Hart as club chairman.

Thirty-one players made at least one appearance in nationally organised first-team competition, and there were fifteen different goalscorers. Full-back Frank Womack was ever-present over the 40-match season. Jack Hall was leading scorer with 21 goals, all of which came in the league.

Football League Second Division

League table (part)

FA Cup

Appearances and goals

Players with name struck through and marked  left the club during the playing season.

See also
Birmingham City F.C. seasons

References
General
 Matthews, Tony (1995). Birmingham City: A Complete Record. Breedon Books (Derby). .
 Matthews, Tony (2010). Birmingham City: The Complete Record. DB Publishing (Derby). .
 Source for match dates and results: "Birmingham City 1911–1912: Results". Statto Organisation. Retrieved 20 May 2012.
 Source for lineups, appearances, goalscorers and attendances: Matthews (2010), Complete Record, pp. 268–69. Note that attendance figures are estimated.
 Source for kit: "Birmingham City". Historical Football Kits. Retrieved 22 May 2018.

Specific

Birmingham City F.C. seasons
Birmingham